Maklavan-e Bala (also Romanized as Māklavān-e Bālā) was a village in Sardar-e Jangal Rural District, Sardar-e Jangal District, Fuman County, Gilan Province, Iran. At the 2006 census, its population was 796, in 209 families.  It is now part of the city or Maklavan.

References 

Former populated places in Gilan Province
Fuman County